Danilo Mainardi  (25 November 1933 – 8 March 2017) was an Italian ethologist, scholar, and writer.

Life 
Born in Milan, the son of Enzo Mainardi, he graduated in 1956 in biology in Parma. From 1967 to 1992 he taught zoology, and then biology and ethology at the University of Parma, in the Science and Medicine faculties. From 1973 he directed the School of Ethology of the Scientific cultural center Ettore Majorana in Erice.

He taught Ethology of Behaviour at the Ca' Foscari University of Venice.

He was national president of LIPU (Lega italiana protezione uccelli, Italian League for the defence of birds, founded in 1965 and Italian partner of Birdlife International), and later became its honorary president.

Mainardi studied the social and sexual behaviour of animals, and its evolution, starting from the relationships between parents and offspring (particularly the importance of the "imprinting"). His studies demonstrate that also the animals can transmit - to a certain extent - the capacity to transfer solution to problems from one individual to another: the process of innovation according to Mainardi's results is not exclusive of mankind.

He directed the Italian Journal of Zoology, organ of the Italian Zoological association (Unione Zoologica italiana). Besides his researches and teachings, he was most popular in Italy as a regular and appreciated guest at various  scientific TV programs, such as Dalla parte degli animali (On the animals' side), and the scientific series Quark, the first show of the kind in Italy aimed at a general public, created in 1981 by Italian journalist Piero Angela. Since the beginnings, Mainardi was a regular contributor to Quark, cooperating with Piero Angela to spread the interest for the scientific matters, making a point in using the simplest possible language even for complex subjects, to reach every spectator.

He was an atheist, and president of Union of Rationalist Atheists and Agnostics.

Mainardi also contributed to several Italian major newspaper, such as the Corriere della Sera, and has written more than 200 publications and books.

Bibliography
1974 - L'animale culturale (The cultural animal), BUR
1975 - La scelta sessuale nell'evoluzione della specie, Bollati Boringhieri
1989 - Novanta animali, Bollati Boringhieri
1991 - Animali e uomini, Il Cigno Galileo Galilei
1991 - Galapagos e Patagonia. Sulle orme di Darwin, Il Cigno Galileo Galilei
1991 - Etologia & protezione animale, Editoriale Grasso]
1992 - Il cane e la volpe, Einaudi
1992 - Dizionario di Etologia, Einaudi
1994 - Lo zoo aperto, Einaudi
1995 - Il corno del rinoceronte, Mondadori
1996 - Del cane, del gatto e di altri animali, Mondadori
1997 - Gli animali fanno così, Giunti Editore
2000 - La strategia dell'aquila (The Strategy of the Eagle), Mondadori
2001 - L'animale irrazionale, Mondadori
2002 - L'etologia caso per caso, (Case studies in Ethology) Airplane
2003 - Arbitri e galline, Mondadori
2006 - Nella mente degli animali (In the animals' mind), Cairo Publishing
2008 - La bella zoologia (The nice Zoology), Cairo Publishing
2009 - L'intelligenza degli animali (The intelligence of animals), Cairo Publishing

Among his publications in English: 
 "Sociobiology: beyond nature/nurture?", American Association Adv.Sc.
 "The biology of aggression", Sijtoff & Nordhoff
 "The behaviour of Human Infant", Plenum
 "Fear and Defence", Harwood
 "Infanticide and Parental care", Harwood
 "Food preferences", Harwood
 "Behavioural ecology of fishes", Harwood
 "Vertebrate mating systems", World Scientific

References

External links

Member of Accademia Nazionale delle Scienze
ENGLISH bio notes
ENGLISH Journey in the mind of the animals - Written and audio contributions at Festival della mente di Sarzana 2008

1933 births
2017 deaths
Ethologists
University of Parma alumni
Academic staff of the University of Parma
Italian zoologists
Writers from Milan
Academic staff of the Ca' Foscari University of Venice